In computational complexity theory, the exponential time hypothesis is an unproven computational hardness assumption that was formulated by . It states that satisfiability of 3-CNF Boolean formulas cannot be solved more quickly than exponential time in the worst case. The exponential time hypothesis, if true, would imply that P ≠ NP, but it is a stronger statement. It implies that many computational problems are equivalent in complexity, in the sense that if one of them has a subexponential time algorithm then they all do, and that many known algorithms for these problems have optimal or near-optimal time

Definition
The  problem is a version of the Boolean satisfiability problem in which the input to the problem is a Boolean expression in conjunctive normal form (that is, an and of ors of variables and their negations) with at most  variables per clause.

Some sources define the exponential time hypothesis to be the slightly weaker statement that 3-SAT cannot be solved in  If there existed an algorithm to solve 3-SAT in  then  would equal zero.  However, it is consistent with current knowledge that there could be a sequence of 3-SAT algorithms, each with running time  for a sequence of numbers  tending towards zero, but where the descriptions of these algorithms are so quickly growing that a single algorithm could not automatically select and run the most appropriate one. If this were to be the case, then  would equal zero even though there would be no single algorithm running in  A related variant of the exponential time hypothesis is the non-uniform exponential time hypothesis, which posits that there is no family of algorithms (one for each length of the input, in the spirit of advice) that can solve 3-SAT in 

Because the numbers  form a monotonic sequence that is bounded above by one, they must converge to a limit  The strong exponential time hypothesis (SETH) is the conjecture

Implications

Satisfiability

The sparsification lemma is proven by repeatedly finding large sets of clauses that have a nonempty common intersection in a given formula, and replacing the formula by two simpler formulas, one of which has each of these clauses replaced by their common intersection and the other of which has the intersection removed from each clause. By applying the sparsification lemma and then using new variables to split the clauses, one may then obtain a set of  3-CNF formulas, each with a linear number of variables, such that the original  formula is satisfiable if and only if at least one of these 3-CNF formulas is satisfiable. Therefore, if 3-SAT could be solved in subexponential time, one could use this reduction to solve  in subexponential time as well. Equivalently,  for  then  as well, and the exponential time hypothesis would be 

The limiting value   of the sequence of numbers  is at most equal  where  is the infimum of the numbers  such that satisfiability of conjunctive normal form formulas without clause length limits can be solved in  Therefore, if the strong exponential time hypothesis is true, then there would be no algorithm for general CNF satisfiability that is significantly faster than a brute-force search over all possible truth assignments.

Other search problems
Conversely, if any of these problems has a subexponential algorithm, then the exponential time hypothesis could be shown to be 

If cliques or independent sets of logarithmic size could be found in polynomial time, the exponential time hypothesis would be false. Therefore, even though finding cliques or independent sets of such small size is unlikely to be NP-complete, the exponential time hypothesis implies that these problems are  More generally, the exponential time hypothesis implies that it is not possible to find cliques or independent sets of size  in  The exponential time hypothesis also implies that it is not possible to solve the -SUM problem (given  real numbers, find  of them that add to zero) in 
The strong exponential time hypothesis implies that it is not possible to find  dominating sets more quickly than in 

The exponential time hypothesis implies also that the weighted feedback arc set problem on tournaments does not have a parametrized algorithm with running  It does however have a parameterized algorithm with running 

The strong exponential time hypothesis leads to tight bounds on the parameterized complexity of several graph problems on graphs of bounded treewidth. In particular, if the strong exponential time hypothesis is true, then the optimal time bound for finding independent sets on graphs of   the optimal time for the dominating set problem  the optimum time for maximum cut  and the optimum time for   Equivalently, any improvement on these running times would falsify the strong exponential time  The exponential time hypothesis also implies that any fixed-parameter tractable algorithm for edge clique cover must have double exponential dependence on the

Communication complexity
The goal is for the parties to transmit as few bits to each other on a shared communications channel in order for one of the parties to be able to determine whether the intersection of the three sets is empty or nonempty. A trivial  communications protocol would be for one of the three parties to transmit a bitvector describing the intersection of the two sets known to that party, after which either of the two remaining parties can determine the emptiness of the intersection. Therefore, the strong exponential time hypothesis implies either that the trivial protocol for three-party set disjointness is optimal, or that any better protocol requires an exponential amount of

Structural complexity
If the exponential time hypothesis is true, then 3-SAT would not have a polynomial time algorithm, and therefore it would follow that P ≠ NP. More strongly, in this case, 3-SAT could not even have a quasi-polynomial time algorithm, so NP could not be a subset of QP. However, if the exponential time hypothesis fails, it would have no implication for the P versus NP problem. A padding argument proves the existence of NP-complete problems for which the best known running times have the form   and if the best possible running time for 3-SAT were of this form, then P would be unequal to NP (because 3-SAT is NP-complete and this time bound is not polynomial) but the exponential time hypothesis would be false.

In parameterized complexity theory, because the exponential time hypothesis implies that there does not exist a fixed-parameter-tractable algorithm for maximum clique, it also implies that  It is an important open problem in this area whether this implication can be reversed: does  imply the exponential time hypothesis?

It is also possible to prove implications in the other direction, from the failure of a variation of the strong exponential time hypothesis to separations of complexity classes.
As  shows, if there exists an algorithm  that solves Boolean circuit satisfiability in time  for some superpolynomially growing  then NEXPTIME is not a subset of P/poly. Williams shows that, if algorithm  exists, and a family of circuits simulating NEXPTIME in P/poly also existed, then algorithm  could be composed with the circuits to simulate NEXPTIME problems nondeterministically in a smaller amount of time, violating the time hierarchy theorem. Therefore, the existence of algorithm  proves the nonexistence of the family of circuits and the separation of these two complexity

See also
Savitch's theorem, showing that a similar exponential gap cannot hold for space complexity

Notes

Further reading

Computational hardness assumptions